The Brown Pusey House, now the Brown Pusey House Community Center, is a historic home built by John Y. Hill at 128 N. Maine St. in Elizabethtown, Kentucky.  It was built in 1825 and includes Georgian and Federal architecture.  It has also been known as Hill House and as Aunt Beck's.  It was listed on the National Register of Historic Places in 1974;  the listing includes just one contributing building but a  area.  It has served as a hotel. It included the Pusey Room Museum.

The house is named for William A. Pusey and his brother Alfred Brown Pusey, who restored it in the 1920s and donated it to the community.

References

External links
 Brown-Pusey House - official site

Houses on the National Register of Historic Places in Kentucky
Georgian architecture in Kentucky
Federal architecture in Kentucky
Houses completed in 1825
Houses in Hardin County, Kentucky
Museums in Hardin County, Kentucky
National Register of Historic Places in Hardin County, Kentucky
Community centers in Kentucky
Elizabethtown, Kentucky
1825 establishments in Kentucky
Historic house museums in Kentucky